The Videos 1994–2001 is a music video compilation by the Dave Matthews Band, released on August 21, 2001 on VHS and DVD. The compilation features all of the band's 12 music videos from their first four albums, from "What Would You Say" to "The Space Between", with the earliest released in 1995, contrary to the compilation's title. Each video features a Dolby Digital stereo and 5.1 surround sound mix, as well as an audio commentary by the video's director. The compilation also features a behind-the-scenes documentary for "Don't Drink the Water", "Stay (Wasting Time)", and "I Did It".

Track listing

References

Dave Matthews Band video albums
2001 video albums
Music video compilation albums
2001 compilation albums